Mel Wilson (1917-2007) was an all-star and record setting Grey Cup champion Canadian football player, playing from 1937 to 1951.

A Winnipeg native, Wilson played his first football with St. John's College, later playing two seasons at Kelvin High School. In 1936 he captained the St. John's Roamers, who defeated the Moose Jaw Millers 13-5 to win the Western Canada Junior football championship.

In 1937 he joined his hometown Winnipeg Blue Bombers for a 5-year stretch, playing in 4 Grey Cup games, and winning two in 1939 and 1941 (in which scored a touchdown.) In 1942 he joined the citywide all-star team, the Winnipeg RCAF Bombers, for the playoffs, losing another Grey Cup. He played 1943 with the Winnipeg United Services Combines and did not play in 1944.

In 1945 he rejoined the Bombers for 3 seasons, playing in 3 more Grey Cup losses. He signed with the Montreal Alouettes for 12 games in 1948. He finished his career with 3 more seasons with the Calgary Stampeders and was part of their 1949 Grey Cup losing team.

In all, Wilson played in nine Grey Cup championships, the most by any player until his record was later tied by six other players. He was also an all-star in 1941, 1946 and 1947 with the Bombers and in 1949 with the Stampeders.

After he retired he was a successful amateur athlete, winning trophies in golf, curling, racquetball and competitive ballroom dancing. He worked with the Manitoba Labour Board, Winnipeg Hydro, retiring, age 80, as a commissionaire at the provincial legislature.

He was inducted into the Winnipeg Football Club Hall of Fame in 1985 and the Manitoba Sports Hall of Fame in 2004.

He died, age 90, in Winnipeg on July 29, 2007.

References

External links
Just Sports Stats

1917 births
2007 deaths
Canadian football offensive linemen
Winnipeg Blue Bombers players
Montreal Alouettes players
Calgary Stampeders players
Players of Canadian football from Manitoba
Canadian football people from Winnipeg